The FC Basel 1943–44 season was the fifty-first season since the club's foundation on 15 November 1893. FC Basel played their home games in the Landhof in the district Wettstein in Kleinbasel. Albert Besse was the club's chairman for the fifth consecutive season.

Overview 
Team manager Eugen Rupf left the club following the last season and Willy Wolf was appointed as Basel's new team manager. Basel played 41 games in their 1943–44 season. 26 in the Nationalliga, five in the cup and ten were test games. They won 18, drew 11 and lost 12 times. In total, including the test games and the cup competition, they scored 83 goals and conceded 65.

There were 14 teams contesting in the 1943–44 Nationalliga. The team that finished in last position in the league table would be relegated. Basel played a mediocre season, winning nine matches, drawing eight and suffered nine defeats they ended the season with 26 points in 9th position. Lausanne-Sport won the Swiss championship, Luzern were relegated. Alfred Weisshaar was Basel's top league goal scorer with 15 goals, joint second league scorer with Alfred Bickel (Grasshopper Club) behind top scorer Erich Andres (Young Fellows Zürich) who netted 23 times.

In the Swiss Cup Basel started in the round of 32 with a home tie at the Landhof against lower tier local side Nordstern Basel. This was won 4–1. In the round of 16 they had a home tie and won 6–2 against St. Gallen. The quarter-final gave Basel another home tie and they won 5–1 against Young Boys. The semi-final was an away tie against Biel-Bienne. Hans Vonthron's goal was the only goal of the game and Basel qualified for the final. This was played on 10 April in Wankdorf Stadium in Bern against Lausanne-Sport. Two goals from Numa Monnard and one from Roger Courtois during the last five minutes of the match meant that Basel lost the game 0–3 and Lausanne won the national double.

Players 

 
 
 
 

 

 
 

  

 

Players who left the squad

Results

Legend

Friendly matches

Pre- and mid-season

Mid- to end of season

Nationalliga

League matches

League table

League standings

Swiss Cup

See also 
 History of FC Basel
 List of FC Basel players
 List of FC Basel seasons

References

Sources 
 Rotblau: Jahrbuch Saison 2014/2015. Publisher: FC Basel Marketing AG. 
 Die ersten 125 Jahre. Publisher: Josef Zindel im Friedrich Reinhardt Verlag, Basel. 
 FCB team 1943/44 at fcb-archiv.ch
 Switzerland 1943/44 by Erik Garin at Rec.Sport.Soccer Statistics Foundation

External links
 FC Basel official site

FC Basel seasons
Basel